Concorezzo (Milanese: Cuncuress) is a comune (municipality) in the Province of Monza and Brianza in the Italian region Lombardy, located about  northeast of Milan. It received the honorary title of city with a presidential decree on 25 September 1989.

Concorezzo borders the following municipalities: Arcore, Vimercate, Monza, Villasanta, Agrate Brianza. In the 13th century  it was one of the major centre of the Cathars in northern Italy, until they were annihilated by the podestà of Milan, Oldrado da Tresseno.

Immigration 
 Demographic Statistics

Gallery

References

External links
 Official website